The 2007–08 [International Hockey League season was the 17th season of the International Hockey League (Colonial Hockey League before 1997, United Hockey League before 2007), a North American minor professional league. Six teams participated in the regular season and the Fort Wayne Komets won the league title.

Regular season

Turner Cup-Playoffs

External links
 Season 2007/08 on hockeydb.com 

United Hockey League seasons
IHL
IHL